Getúlio Wandelly Silva Timoteo (born 10 June 1997), simply known as Getúlio, is a Brazilian footballer who plays  as a forward for Ventforet Kofu, on loan from Tombense.

Club career
Born in Major Isidoro, Getúlio started his youth career with Tombense and arrived at the academy of Avaí in 2013. In 2018, he was promoted to the senior team and on 21 January, made his professional debut in the second round of Campeonato Catarinense in a 2–1 victory against Joinville. On 15 February, he scored his first ever goal for the club in a 3–1 victory against Brusque.

Although Getúlio suffered an injury in March, he recovered from it before a Copa do Brasil match against Fluminense. However, he was red-carded in the 17th minute after receiving his second yellow card. On 21 April, he scored his first Série B goal for the club in a 2–2 draw against Brasil de Pelotas. Following the club's promotion to 2019 Série A, his contract was extended for the upcoming season on 7 December.

Club statistics

Honours
Avaí
Campeonato Catarinense: 2019
Ventforet Kofu
Emperor's Cup: 2022

References

External links
Avaí Futebol Clube  profile

1997 births
Living people
Brazilian footballers
Association football forwards
Campeonato Brasileiro Série A players
Campeonato Brasileiro Série B players
Avaí FC players
CR Vasco da Gama players
Ventforet Kofu players
J2 League players